Euryleptidae is a family of marine polyclad flatworms.

Genera
The following genera are listed by the World Register of Marine Species:

Acerotisa Strand, 1928
Anciliplana Heath & McGregor, 1912
Ascidiophilla Newman, 2002
Cycloporus Lang, 1884
Eurylepta Ehrenberg, 1831
Euryleptodes Heath & McGregor, 1912
Graffizoon Heath, 1928
Katheurylepta Faubel, 1984
Leptoteredra Hallez, 1913
Maritigrella Newman & Cannon, 2000
Oligoclado Pearse, 1938
Oligocladus Lang, 1884
Parastylostomum Faubel, 1984
Pareurylepta Faubel, 1984
Praestheceraeus Faubel, 1984
Prostheceraeus Schmarda, 1859
Stygolepta Faubel, 1984
Stylostomum Lang, 1884

Gallery

See also 
 Maritigrella crozierae - tiger flatworm
 Maritigrella fuscopunctata
 Prostheceraeus vittatus - candy striped flatworm

References 

Turbellaria